Veerlapalem, is a major village in Duggirala mandal in Guntur district of Andhra Pradesh, South India.

Geography 
It is in the historic southern route from Vijayawada to Repalle along with River Krishna and is bounded on its south side by the Pedapalem route and on the west by road Connected to Nuthakki Village.

History
Veerlapalem is known for its rich cultural and literary legacy. There is a famous temple in Veerlapalem village (almost 100 years old) Sir Rama Temple. & Bible mission Maranatha Maimalayam Church is also famous

Demographics
The total population is about 1000. The population divides by age group roughly into: 25% aged 18 and under, 50% aged between 18 and 60, 25% aged 60 or over.

Education 
The primary and secondary school education is imparted by government, aided and private schools, under the School Education Department of the state. There are no student enrollment in any school of the village.

References 

Villages in Guntur district